= New Orleans Monthly Review =

New Orleanian magazine

New Orleans Monthly Review was an American magazine published from 1874 to 1876 in New Orleans, by Daniel K. Whitaker. The magazine appeared irregularly; in 1878 two issues appeared as New Orleans Quarterly Review.
